Alejandro Matías Kruchowski (born 20 January 1983 in Buenos Aires, Argentina) is an Argentine former football defender.

Career
Kruchowski started his career at one of the most popular teams in Argentina, River Plate of the Argentine First Division. In 2004, he was signed by Querétaro FC of the Primera División Mexicana, but in 2005 he returned in Argentina being signed by Atlanta.

In 2006 Kruchowski stayed as free agent, but in 2007 he was signed by the Paraguayan club Sol de América, but he played only one season, after that he again became a free agent in the first semester of 2008.

In the middle of 2008 Kruchowski signed for Santiago Morning, in his first season he played a total of 16 matches and scored a total of 2 goals, in his second season he had a good performance, although he scored only one goal in that season.

In 2010 Kruchowski joined Astra Ploieşti in Romania and was transferred to Cobreloa later that year.

External links
 
 Ceroacero profile
 
 
 

1983 births
Living people
Argentine footballers
Association football defenders
Argentine people of Polish descent
Club Atlético River Plate footballers
Defensores Unidos footballers
Club Sol de América footballers
Aldosivi footballers
Santiago Morning footballers
FC Astra Giurgiu players
Cobreloa footballers
Querétaro F.C. footballers
Primera Nacional players
Chilean Primera División players
Club Ferrocarril Midland players
Primera B de Chile players
Liga I players
Expatriate footballers in Chile
Expatriate footballers in Mexico
Expatriate footballers in Paraguay
Expatriate footballers in Romania
Argentine expatriate sportspeople in Romania
Footballers from Buenos Aires